Auzata plana is a moth in the family Drepanidae. It was described by Hong-Fu Chu and Lin-Yao Wang in 1988. It is found in Sichuan, China.

The length of the forewings is about 23 mm. Adults are similar to Auzata chinensis, but there is an indistinct cross line on the forewings and the hindwings are without a tooth-shaped marking at the outside of the median line.

References

Moths described in 1988
Drepaninae
Moths of Asia